Eliozeta is a genus of flies in the family Tachinidae.

Species
E. helluo (Fabricius, 1805)
E. pellucens (Fallén, 1820)

References

Phasiinae
Tachinidae genera
Taxa named by Camillo Rondani